The 2008 Skycity Triple Crown was the sixth round of the 2008 V8 Supercar season. It was held on the weekend of July 4 to 6 at Hidden Valley Raceway in Darwin, Australia.

Qualifying 
Qualifying was on Saturday July 5.

Race 1 
Race 1 was held on Saturday July 5.

Race 2 
Race 2 was held on Sunday July 6.

Race 3 
Race 3 was held on Sunday July 6.

Results
Results as follows:

Qualifying

Standings
After round 6 of 14.

Support categories
The 2008 Skycity Triple Crown had four support categories.

References

External links
Official timing and results

Darwin
Sport in Darwin, Northern Territory
2000s in the Northern Territory
Motorsport in the Northern Territory